The Morane-Saulnier N, also known as the Morane-Saulnier Type N, was a French monoplane fighter aircraft of the First World War. Designed and manufactured by Morane-Saulnier, the Type N entered service in April 1915 with the Aéronautique Militaire designated as the MoS-5 C1. It also equipped four squadrons of the Royal Flying Corps, in which it was nicknamed the Bullet, and was operated in limited numbers by the 19th Squadron of the Imperial Russian Air Force.

Description

While the Type N was a clean, streamlined aircraft, it was not easy to fly due to a combination of stiff lateral control caused by using wing warping instead of ailerons, sensitive pitch and yaw controls caused by using an all flying tail, and very high landing speed for the period. The Type N mounted a single unsynchronized forward-firing 7.9 mm Hotchkiss machine gun which used the deflector wedges first used on the Morane-Saulnier Type L, in order to fire through the propeller arc. The later I and V types used a .303-in Vickers machine gun.

A large metal "casserolle" spinner, appearing much like those used on the Deperdussin Monocoque pre-war racer of 1912, was designed to streamline the aircraft; but caused the engines to overheat. In 1915, the spinners were removed and the overheating problems disappeared with little loss in performance.

49 aircraft were built but it was quickly rendered obsolete by the pace of aircraft development.

Variants
Morane-Saulnier Type N
Single-seat fighter-scout monoplane.
Morane-Saulnier Type Nm
The Type Nm had a modified tail unit. Built in small numbers.
Morane-Saulnier I
more powerful version with 110  Le Rhône 9J.
Morane-Saulnier V
Longer range version of I.

Operators

 
 Aeronautique Militaire
 
 Imperial Russian Air Force
  Ukrainian People's Republic
 Ukrainian People's Republic Air Fleet - Three aircraft.
 
 Royal Flying Corps
 No. 4 Squadron RFC
 No. 60 Squadron RFC

Specifications (Type N)

See also

References

Bibliography

Bruce, J.M. War Planes of the First World War: Fighters: Volume Five. London: Macdonald, 1972. .
Bruce, Jack. "The Bullets and the Guns". Air Enthusiast. No. 9, February–May 1979. pp. 61–75. 
 

1910s French fighter aircraft
Military aircraft of World War I
Morane-Saulnier aircraft
Single-engined tractor aircraft
Aircraft first flown in 1914
Rotary-engined aircraft
Shoulder-wing aircraft